ʿAlāʾ ad-Dīn al-Baṣīr (died 1294) was a mamluk who became an emir. He was a supervisor of Jerusalem's waqf charitable endowments
and inspector of the Two Noble Sanctuaries of Jerusalem and Hebron.

He lived during the final years of the Ayyūbid dynasty (under aṣ-Ṣāliḥ) and the beginning of the Mamlūk dynasty (under Baybars and Qalāwūn).

Names 

 ʿAlāʾ ad-Dīn al-Baṣīr:  is a nickname that means "astute, insightful". The nickname also becomes  and / in placenames.
 ʿAlāʾ ad-Dīn Aydughdī ibn ʿAbdallāh aṣ-Ṣaliḥī an-Najmī:  is a nisba (noun + ), meaning he was a mamluk of aṣ-Ṣāliḥ Najm ad-Dīn, an Ayyūbid emir.
 ʿAlāʾ ad-Dīn Aydughdī ar-Ruknī:  may refer to Baybars, a Mamlūk sultan whom he served. 

He is not to be confused with ʿAlāʾ ad-Dīn Aydughdī ibn ʿAbdallāh al-Kubakī (al-Kabakī), buried in the Kubakiyya mausoleum in the Mamilla Cemetery.

Legacy 

He was responsible for a number of building projects in Jerusalem. Some places in the city bear his name.

 Aladdin Ribat (ʿAlāʾ ad-Dīn al-Baṣīr Ribat) / al-Baṣīrī Mosque, a ribat outside the Inspector's Gate. During its construction, he used his cane as a yardstick and found a measurement mistake that sighted people overlooked. It includes his tomb/shrine and homes to a community of Afro-Palestinians.
 Inspector's Gate (ʿAlāʾ ad-Dīn al-Baṣīr Gate) was named after the ribat.
 Aladdin Street: named after the ribat.
 al-Būṣayrī Sabil (al-Baṣīr Sabil), a sebil (fountain) named after him.
 Ablution Gate and the Ablution Place west (outside) of the gate: restored by him.

He also built structures in Hebron:
 A bathhouse: He drew up its plan while he was blind.
 A storage installation for wheat and barley.

References 

Year of birth unknown
1294 deaths
Slaves from the Ayyubid Sultanate
13th-century people from the Mamluk Sultanate
Mamluk emirs